Peka Peka, sometimes spelled Pekapeka, is a seaside locality on the Kapiti Coast of New Zealand's North Island. It is located just off State Highway 1 and the North Island Main Trunk railway between Waikanae and Te Horo.

Peka Peka was briefly internationally famous when a young emperor penguin, nicknamed Happy Feet, appeared on Peka Peka beach on 21 June 2011. Emperor penguins are usually only found in the Antarctic.

Peka Peka Beach is a clothing-optional beach by custom. New Zealand has no official nude beaches, as public nudity is legal on any beach where it is "known to occur".

Demographics

Peka Peka had a population of 612 at the 2018 New Zealand census, an increase of 108 people (21.4%) since the 2013 census, and an increase of 255 people (71.4%) since the 2006 census. There were 246 households. There were 303 males and 309 females, giving a sex ratio of 0.98 males per female. The median age was 52.1 years (compared with 37.4 years nationally), with 99 people (16.2%) aged under 15 years, 66 (10.8%) aged 15 to 29, 300 (49.0%) aged 30 to 64, and 144 (23.5%) aged 65 or older.

Ethnicities were 93.1% European/Pākehā, 6.4% Māori, 2.0% Pacific peoples, 3.4% Asian, and 3.4% other ethnicities (totals add to more than 100% since people could identify with multiple ethnicities).

The proportion of people born overseas was 24.0%, compared with 27.1% nationally.

Although some people objected to giving their religion, 58.8% had no religion, 31.4% were Christian, 0.5% were Hindu, 1.0% were Muslim, 1.0% were Buddhist and 2.0% had other religions.

Of those at least 15 years old, 168 (32.7%) people had a bachelor or higher degree, and 54 (10.5%) people had no formal qualifications. The median income was $42,500, compared with $31,800 nationally. The employment status of those at least 15 was that 219 (42.7%) people were employed full-time, 99 (19.3%) were part-time, and 15 (2.9%) were unemployed.

The demographics for Peka Peka are also incorporated in Waikanae#Demographics.

References 

Populated places in the Wellington Region
Kapiti Coast District
Naturism in New Zealand
Nude beaches
Beaches of the Wellington Region